The Arkansas City Country Club Site (14CO3), near Arkansas City, Kansas, United States, is a  archeological site of prehistoric village with graves/burials. It was listed on the National Register of Historic Places in 1978 for its potential to yield information in the future.

The site is located near the Walnut River, in or near Creswell Township. The site includes man-made mounds, some of which contain burials.

The site was first excavated in 1916. In 1994 and 1996, archaeologists excavating the site consulted with the Wichita and Affiliated Tribes, the likely descendants of the people who built the site.

See also
 Etzanoa

External links
 Incised Pipe from 14CO3, Dates: 1400 CE-1725

References

Archaeological sites on the National Register of Historic Places in Kansas
Cowley County, Kansas
Plains Village period
Former Native American populated places in the United States
Native American history of Kansas